Raúl Trapero (12 April 1963 – 15 September 2010) was a Spanish boxer. He competed in the men's featherweight event at the 1984 Summer Olympics.

References

1963 births
2010 deaths
Spanish male boxers
Olympic boxers of Spain
Boxers at the 1984 Summer Olympics
Sportspeople from León, Spain
Featherweight boxers